North Fork Little Snake River is a  tributary of the Little Snake River in Colorado and Wyoming.  It flows from a source in the Medicine Bow National Forest of Carbon County, Wyoming to a confluence with the Middle Fork Little Snake River in Routt County, Colorado that forms the Little Snake River.

See also
 List of rivers of Colorado
 List of rivers of Wyoming
 List of tributaries of the Colorado River

References

Rivers of Colorado
Rivers of Wyoming
Tributaries of the Colorado River
Rivers of Carbon County, Wyoming
Rivers of Routt County, Colorado
Tributaries of the Colorado River in Colorado